Alyona Mikhailovna Starovoitova (born 22 October 1999) is a Russian ice hockey player, currently playing in the Zhenskaya Hockey League (ZhHL) with SKIF Nizhny Novgorod. She participated in the women's ice hockey tournament at the 2018 Winter Olympics in Pyeongchang with the Olympic Athletes from Russia team, and won a gold medal while representing Russia in the women's ice hockey tournament at the 2019 Winter Universiade in Krasnoyarsk.

As a junior player with the Russian national under-18 team, Starovoitova won a bronze medal at the 2017 IIHF U18 Women's World Championship. In the same year, she won the Russian Championship with Tornado Dmitrov.

References

External links 
 
 

1999 births
Living people
Ice hockey people from Moscow
Ice hockey players at the 2018 Winter Olympics
Olympic ice hockey players of Russia
Russian women's ice hockey forwards
HC SKIF players
HC Tornado players
Universiade gold medalists for Russia
Universiade medalists in ice hockey
Competitors at the 2019 Winter Universiade